Randhir is a common Indian male name. It may refer to:

Entertainment
 Randhir (actor), Indian character actor in Hindi and Punjabi films from the 1940s to the 1980s
 Randhir Kapoor (born 1947), Indian actor
 Randhir Gattla, an Indian film actor working in Telugu cinema
 Randhir Witana, Sri Lankan rapper and songwriter

Politics
 Randhir Singh of Bharatpur (died 1823), Indian ruler of princely state Bharatpur
 Randhir Singh Kapriwas, member of the Haryana Legislative Assembly
 Randhir Prasad (died 1980), Indian politician and businessman from Giridih, Bihar
 Rana Randhir, member of the Bharatiya Janata Party from Bihar
 Randhir Pralhadrao Savarkar (born 1973), member of the 15th Maharashtra Legislative Assembly

Sports
 Randhir Singh (sport shooter) (born 1946), Indian trap and skeet shooter
 Randhir Singh Gentle (1922–1981), Indian field hockey player
 Randhir Shindes (1900–?), Indian wrestler
 Randhir Singh (cricketer) (born 1957), Indian cricketer

Other
 Randhir Prasad Verma (1952–1991), Indian police officer
 Randhir Singh (Sikh) (1878–1961), Sikh saint
 Randhir Sud, Indian gastroenterologist
 NJSA Government College, formerly known as Randhir College

See also
Randhir Singh (disambiguation)

Indian masculine given names